Associazione Calcio Dilettantistica Città di Concordia (formerly A.C.D. Sagittaria Julia) is an Italian association football club located in Concordia Sagittaria, Veneto. It currently plays in Promozione.

History 
It was founded in 1952.

In the season 2011–12 it was relegated to Eccellenza after four seasons in Serie D.

Colors and badge 
The team's color are black and blue.

References

External links
Official homepage

Football clubs in Italy
Football clubs in Veneto
1952 establishments in Italy